Scott DeVoss (born February 26, 1996) is an American professional soccer player who plays as a defender.

Career

College and amateur
DeVoss spent all four years of his college career at the University of Denver between 2015 and 2018, scoring 6 goals and tallying 1 assist in 83 appearances.

DeVoss also played for Colorado Rapids U23 in the USL Premier Development League in both 2017 and 2018.

Professional
On January 14, 2019, DeVoss was selected 59th overall in the 2019 MLS SuperDraft by Orlando City. However, he was released by the club early on during their pre-season.

DeVoss later joined USL Championship side Hartford Athletic ahead of their inaugural season.

On April 11, 2019, DeVoss was loaned to USL League One side FC Tucson.

References

External links

Denver bio

Living people
1996 births
American soccer players
Association football defenders
Colorado Rapids U-23 players
Denver Pioneers men's soccer players
FC Tucson players
Hartford Athletic players
Orlando City SC draft picks
People from Centennial, Colorado
Soccer players from Colorado
Sportspeople from the Denver metropolitan area
USL League One players
USL League Two players